The 1959–60 season was Stoke City's 53rd season in the Football League and the 20th in the Second Division.

Stoke had a very poor end to an uneventful 1950s as for most of the season the side looked capable of mounting a promotion challenge but a truly awful run of results in March and April (10 straight defeats) meant that Stoke dropped down the table and only avoided relegation by five points as they finished in 17th position. At the end of the season new chairman Albert Hensall decided that a change of manager was needed and so sacked Frank Taylor and replaced him with Tony Waddington who would bring a new era to the club.

Season review

League
The 1959–60 season began well with new signing from Burnley, Doug Newlands tormenting the Sunderland defence in a 3–1 victory. But thereafter their form rate was erratic although Lincoln City were beaten 6–1 with Dennis Wilshaw grabbing a fine hat trick. Soon after that win over Lincoln a 19-year-old Tony Allen won his first England cap. But it was proving difficult on the pitch for Stoke as after a 1–0 home win against Plymouth Argyle on 27 February 1960 Stoke sat in 6th position in the table looking to start a push for promotion, but 10 matches later they were in 17th five points away from relegation.

It was in defence where the problems lay as manager Frank Taylor used four different keepers one of which was Tommy Younger a fine keeper for Liverpool but in his ten matches for Stoke he lost nine of them conceding 22 goals and he quickly left. Ken Thomson was sold to Middlesbrough and legendary striker Frank Bowyer decided to retire.

However the biggest move at the end of the season was made by new chairman Albert Henshall who decided that after eight years at the club it was time for a change of manager and so Frank Taylor was sacked. In truth Stoke were as far away from top flight football than ever with crowds dropping and overall performances on the pitch had been the biggest disappointment. Despite this Taylor was shocked at being fired and vowed never to be associated with football again. In his place Henshall appointed Taylor's assistant Tony Waddington and Len Graham became Waddington's assistant.

FA Cup
Stoke failed to make it past the third round this season losing 3–1 away at Preston North End in a replay.

Final league table

Results

Stoke's score comes first

Legend

Football League Second Division

FA Cup

Squad statistics

References

Stoke City F.C. seasons
Stoke